Muhammad Salah-ud-din (born 8 September 1948) is a Pakistani wrestler. He competed in the men's freestyle 90 kg at the 1976 Summer Olympics.

References

External links 
 

1948 births
Living people
Pakistani male sport wrestlers
Olympic wrestlers of Pakistan
Wrestlers at the 1976 Summer Olympics
Place of birth missing (living people)
Asian Games medalists in wrestling
Asian Games bronze medalists for Pakistan
Wrestlers at the 1974 Asian Games
Wrestlers at the 1978 Asian Games
Wrestlers at the 1982 Asian Games
Wrestlers at the 1986 Asian Games
Wrestlers at the 1990 Asian Games
Medalists at the 1978 Asian Games
20th-century Pakistani people